Ksenia Vitalyevna Perova (born 8 February 1989 in Lesnoy, Sverdlovsk Oblast) is a Russian female archer. At the 2012 Summer Olympics she competed for her country in the Women's team event, and went on to compete in the 2016 Summer Olympics as well.

At the 2012 Summer Olympics, she finished in 5th place in the individual, and 4th with the Russian women's team.  At the 2016 Olympics, she finished in the 17th in the individual but won a silver medal in the team event, with Russia losing to South Korea in the final.

In 2021, she won the gold medal in the women's team recurve event at the 2021 European Archery Championships held in Antalya, Turkey.

References

External links
 
 

1989 births
Living people
People from Lesnoy, Sverdlovsk Oblast
Russian female archers
Olympic archers of Russia
Archers at the 2012 Summer Olympics
Archers at the 2016 Summer Olympics
World Archery Championships medalists
Olympic medalists in archery
Olympic silver medalists for Russia
Medalists at the 2016 Summer Olympics
Archers at the 2019 European Games
Archers at the 2020 Summer Olympics
Olympic silver medalists for the Russian Olympic Committee athletes
Medalists at the 2020 Summer Olympics
Sportspeople from Sverdlovsk Oblast
20th-century Russian women
21st-century Russian women